Champions Series may refer to:

 British Champions Series, the premier races in British flat horse racing
 ISU Grand Prix of Figure Skating, formerly the ISU Champions Series
 Outback Champions Series, Professional tennis events for seniors